Seethamma Pelli is a 1984 Indian Telugu-language drama film directed by Bapu. A remake of the 1978 Tamil film Mullum Malarum, it stars Mohan Babu, Murali Mohan, Mucherla Aruna and Revathi in her Telugu film debut. The film was released on 30 June 1984.

Plot

Cast 
 Mohan Babu
 Murali Mohan
 Mucherla Aruna
 Revathi as Seethamma

Soundtrack 
The soundtrack was composed by S. P. Balasubrahmanyam, and lyrics were written by Veturi.

Release 
Seethamma Pelli was released on 30 June 1984. The film was commercially successful, although not as much as the original. For her performance, Revathi won the Cinema Express Award for Best Telugu Actress.

References

External links 
 
 

1980s Telugu-language films
1984 drama films
Films directed by Bapu
Films scored by S. P. Balasubrahmanyam
Indian drama films
Telugu remakes of Tamil films